Răstolița is a commune in Mureș County, Transylvania, Romania that is composed of five villages: Andreneasa (Andrástelep), Borzia (Borzia), Gălăoaia (Galonya), Iod (Jód) and Răstolița.

It lies at the foot of the Călimani Mountains and Gurghiu Mountains, on the right bank of the river Mureș. The river Răstolița is a right tributary of the Mureș; it discharges into the Mureș in Răstolița village.

Răstolița commune has a population of 2,230: 82% Romanians, 17% Hungarians, and 1% Romani.

The  dates from the second half of the 18th century.

See also
List of Hungarian exonyms (Mureș County)

References

Communes in Mureș County
Localities in Transylvania